Lavriv is a small village in Sambir Raion (district), Lviv Oblast (province) of Ukraine. It belongs to Staryi Sambir urban hromada, one of the hromadas of Ukraine. 
The population of the village is just about 461 people, and local government is administered by Velykolinynska village council.

Geography 
The village is located in the foothills of the Carpathians terrain of the Staryi Sambir Raion. The nearest railway station is in the village Tershiv. The village is located near the road Highway H13 (Ukraine) from Lviv – Sambir to Uzhhorod.

History and Attractions 
The first record of the village dates back to 1291 year. According to legend, in the village was buried Knyaz Leo I of Galicia (ca. 1228 – ca. 1301) became in turn Knyaz of Belz (1245–1264), Knyaz of Peremyshl, Knyaz of Halych (1264–1269) and Grand Prince of Kiev (1271–1301).

Until 18 July 2020, Bilychi belonged to Staryi Sambir Raion. The raion was abolished in July 2020 as part of the administrative reform of Ukraine, which reduced the number of raions of Lviv Oblast to seven. The area of Staryi Sambir Raion was merged into Sambir Raion.

Lavriv Svyatoonufriyivskyy monastery was founded in the middle of the 13th century in the village of Lavriv.

References

External links 
 village Lavriv
 weather.in.ua
 Słownik geograficzny Królestwa Polskiego i innych krajów słowiańskich, Tom V, S. 613–614.

Literature 
 Історія міст і сіл УРСР : Львівська область, Велика Лінина''. – К. : ГРУРЕ, 1968 р. Page 782 

Villages in Sambir Raion